The albums discography of American singer Johnny Cash spans his lengthy career, from 1954 to 2003. It includes the release of 97 albums, most of them for Columbia Records. Over the years, Cash also collaborated with many of the industry's most notable artists.

Studio albums

1950s

1960s

1970s

1980s

1990s

2000s

2010s

Live albums

Soundtrack albums

Compilation albums

1950s

1960s

1970s

1980s

1990s

2000s

2010s

2020s

Other appearances

Studio

Live

Guest appearances
{| class="wikitable"
|-
! Year
! Song(s)
! Artist(s)
! Album
|-
| 1961
| "A Day in the Canyon"
|Andre Kostelanetz
|The Lure of the Grand Canyon
|-
| 1969
| "Girl from the North Country"
|Bob Dylan
|Nashville Skyline
|-
| 1971
| "A Front Row Seat to Hear Ole Johnny Sing"
|Shel Silverstein
|Freakin' at the Freakers Ball
|-
| rowspan="2" | 1972
| "A Song to Mama""The World Needs a Melody"
|The Carter Family
| Traveling Minstral Band
|-
| "Amazing Grace"
| The Evangel Temple Choir
| The Evangel Temple Choir
|-
| 1975
| "Gospel Ship""Song to Woody""Hey Porter"
| rowspan="2" | The Earl Scruggs Revue
|Anniversary Special, Vol. 1
|-
| rowspan="4" | 1976
| "I Still Miss Someone""My Ship Will Sail" (background vocals)
|Anniversary Special, Vol. 2
|-
| "No Earthly Good"
|The Oak Ridge Boys
|Old Fashioned, Down Home, Hand Clappin'Foot Stompin' Southern Style Gospel Quartet Music
|-
| "My Ship Will Sail"
| The Carter Family
|Country's First Family
|-
| "Love is My Refuge"
| Jack Routh
| 
|-
| rowspan="2" | 1979
| "Jealous Loving Heart""Soldiers Last Letter"
|Ernest Tubb
|The Legend and the Legacy
|-
| "Six Gun Shooting""Help Him, Jesus""The Death of Me"
|Levon HelmEmmylou HarrisCharlie Daniels
|The Legend of Jesse James
|-
| rowspan="2" | 1980
| "What's Good for You (Should Be Alright for Me)""Mother Maybelle"
|Marty StuartCurly SecklerThe Nashville Grass
|Take a Little Time
|-
| "Jordan"
|Emmylou HarrisTony RiceRicky Skaggs
|Roses in the Snow (Emmylou Harris album)
|-
| 1981
| "Mister Garfield"
|Merle Kilgore
|
|-
| rowspan="2" | 1982
| "One More Ride""Hey Porter""Get in Line Brother"
|Marty Stuart
|Busy Bee Cafe
|-
| "That's How I Got to Memphis"
|Rosanne Cash
|Somewhere in the Stars
|-
| rowspan="2" | 1983
| "I Still Miss Someone"
|Bill Monroe
|Bill Monroe and Friends
|-
| "Love Me Tender"
|Julie Andrews
|Love Me Tender
|-
| rowspan="2" | 1984
| "Crazy Old Soldier"
|Ray Charles
|Friendship
|-
| "Suffer Little Children"
|Glen Campbell
|No More Night
|-
| rowspan="2" | 1986
| "Be Careful Who You Love (Arthur's Song)"
|Waylon Jennings
|Sweet Mother Texas
|-
| "Better Class of Losers"
|John SchneiderWaylon Jennings
|Take the Long Way Home (John Schneider album)
|-
| rowspan="2" | 1987
| "The Ten Commandments of Love"
|David Allan Coe
|A Matter of Life and Death
|-
| "Amazing Grace"
| Joanne Cash Yates
|Amazing Grace
|-
| 1988
| "Waitin' for a Southern Train"
| Jimmy Tittle
|Jimmy Tittle
|-
| rowspan="4" | 1989
| "Jesus is Lord""I've Been Saved""Gospel Medley""How Beautiful Heaven Must Be""Lord I'm Coming Home"
| Joanne Cash Yates
|Live
|-
| "Life's Railway to Heaven""Will the Circle Be Unbroken"
|Nitty Gritty Dirt Band
|Will the Circle Be Unbroken: Volume Two
|-
| "Wildwood Flower""Worried Man Blues""Ain't Gonna Work Tomorrow""Church in the Wildwood"
| The Carter Family
|Wildwood Flower
|-
| "Woodcarver"
| Sandy Kelly
|Kelly's Heroes
|-
| rowspan="2" | 1990
| "Thoughts on the Flag" (with George Jones and Tom T. Hall)"Guess Things Happen That Way"
|Tommy Cash
|The 25th Anniversary Album (Tommy Cash album)
|-
| "Get Rhythm"
|Martin Delray
|Get Rhythm
|-
| 1991
| "Man in Black"
|One Bad Pig
|I Scream Sunday
|-
| 1992
| "Doin' My Time"
|Marty Stuart
|This One's Gonna Hurt You
|-
| rowspan="2" | 1993
| "The Wanderer"
|U2
|Zooropa
|-
| "The Devil Comes Back to Georgia"
|Charlie DanielsTravis TrittMarty Stuart
|Heroes (Mark O'Connor album)
|-
| rowspan="3" | 1994
| "Tennessee Stud"
|Michael Martin Murphey
|Horse Legends
|-
| "A Comment from Johnny Cash"
|Rose Maddox
|$35 and a Dream
|-
| "The Little Drummer Boy"
|Ben Keith
|Seven Gates: A Christmas Albumby Ben Keith and Friends
|-
| rowspan="4" | 1995
| "Get Rhythm"
|John Stewart
|Airdream Believer
|-
| "Go Wild""The Winding Stream"
|Carlene Carter
|Little Acts of Treason
|-
| "Where the Soul Never Dies"
| The Cluster Pluckers
|Unplucked
|-
| "Blistered"
| Jimmy Tittle
|It's in the Attitude
|-
| rowspan="4" | 1996
| "Two Old Army Pals""Give Me Back My Job"
|BonoWillie NelsonTom Petty
|Go Cat Go! (Carl Perkins album)
|-
| "Steel Guitar Rag"
| Robby Turner
|Man of Steel
|-
| "Johnny Cash Hit Medley(Ring of Fire/I Walk the Line/Folsom Prison Blues)""I Will Rock and Roll with You""Fly Little Bird" (with John Carter Cash)
| Tom Astor
| Tom Astor
|-
| "It Could Happen Again"
|Collin Raye
|Christmas: The Gift
|-
| 1998
| "I Walk the Line (Revisited)"
|Rodney Crowell
|The Houston Kid
|-
| rowspan="3" | 1999
| "Johnny Cash Outro"
| Marty Stuart
|The Pilgrim
|-
| "Guess Things Happen That Way""Tribute To A Princess""Silver Haired Daddy of Mine""Thoughts on the Flag"
| George JonesTom T. Hall
|Classics (Tommy Cash album)
|-
| "Far Side Banks of Jordan"
| June Carter Cash
|Press On
|-
| 2000
| "Introduction""Take Me Home"
|Ramblin' Jack Elliott
|The Ballad of Ramblin' Jack
|-
| rowspan="2" | 2001
| "Passin' Thru"
|Don HenleyEarl Scruggs
|Earl Scruggs and Friends
|-
| "Big River"
|Trick PonyWaylon Jennings
|Trick Pony (Trick Pony album)
|-
| rowspan="2" |2002
|"Redemption Song"(guitar only)
|Joe Strummer and the Mescaleros
|Streetcore
|-
| "Tears in the Holston River"
| The Nitty Gritty Dirt Band
|Will the Circle Be Unbroken, Vol. 3
|-
| rowspan="4" | 2003
| "September When It Comes"
| Rosanne Cash
|Rules of Travel
|-
| "Keep on the Sunny Side""The Road to Kaintuck""Temptation""Will You Miss Me When I'm Gone""Wildwood Flower"
| June Carter Cash
|Wildwood Flower
|-
| "The Way-Worn Traveler"
|John Carter Cash
|Bitter Harvest
|-
| "I Still Miss Someone"
| Laura Cash White
|Among My Souvenirs
|-
| rowspan="2" | 2004
| "Ballad of a Teenage Queen""Guess Things Happen That Way"
| Jack Clement
|Guess Things Happen That Way
|-
| "We Ought to Be Ashamed"
| Elvis Costello
|Almost Blue
|-
| rowspan="3" | 2005
|"Cowboys and Ladies" (with June Carter Cash) and "Heroes in Black and White"
|Kelly Crabb
|All My Friends Are Cowboys
|-
| "Flesh and Blood"
| Jerry Hensley
|Cool Breeze Blowin'''
|-
| "Cuban Soldier""Jackson""Far Side Banks of Jordan""If I Were a Carpenter"
| June Carter Cash
|Ring of Fire: The Best of June Carter Cash|-
| rowspan="2" | 2006
| "The Good Intent"
| Rosanne Cash
|Black Cadillac|-
| "The Greatest Cowboy of them All""There Ain't No Good Chain Gang""I Do Believe" (as The Highwaymen)
| Waylon Jennings
|Nashville Rebel|-
| rowspan="2" | 2007
| "You Just Can't Beat Jesus Christ"
|Billy Joe Shaver
|Everybody's Brother|-
| "Lower Lights""When He Comes""Softly And Tenderly"
| Joanne Cash
|Gospel|-
| 2008
| "Woodcarver""Ring of Fire"
| Sandy Kelly
|Best of Sandy Kelly|-
| 2010
| "Why Me Lord?"
|Ray Charles
|Rare Genius: The Undiscovered Masters|-
|2012
|"One Too Many Mornings" (remix by The Avett Brothers)
|The Avett Brothers
|Chimes of Freedom|-
| 2013
| "I Ain't Gonna Work Tomorrow"
|Carlene Carter
|Carter Girl|-
| 2017
| "Hell, This Ain't Heaven"
| John Schneider
|Hell, This Ain't Heaven|-
| 2019
| "Redemption Day"
|Sheryl Crow
|Threads|}

Audiobooks

Video albums

Tribute albums

References

 Whitburn, Joel. Joel Whitburn's Bubbling Under Singles & Albums'' (1998): 42.

External links
 The official Johnny Cash site

 
Country music discographies
Discographies of American artists
Folk music discographies
Rock music discographies